Marko Rehmer (born 29 April 1972) is a German former professional footballer who played mainly as a right-back.

Club career 
Rehmer was born in East Berlin. In his youth he played for hometown 1. FC Union Berlin; he arrived in the first division at almost 25, joining former East Germany's Hansa Rostock during the 1997 winter transfer window. He was crucial for the side during his two half-seasons spell, as it always maintained its top level status.

For the following six years, Rehmer played with another club from his city, Hertha BSC; being an important defensive unit as the side always made the UEFA Cup in the first four seasons, he was also grossly undermined by several injuries.

In 2005, Rehmer moved to Eintracht Frankfurt. Following more injuries, he was forced to retire at the end of 2006–07, after helping with 12 matches in the team's final escape from relegation.

International career 
Rehmer got 35 caps for Germany during five years, scoring four times. His debut came on 2 September 1998, in a 2–1 friendly win in Malta.

His best years were 2000–01, as he played in 20 internationals, including twice at UEFA Euro 2000, where the national side – the holders – were ousted in the group stages; he was also summoned to the 2002 FIFA World Cup, getting a runners-up medal with his 45 minutes against Paraguay, in the round of 16 (1–0).

International goals
Scores and results list Germany's goal tally first, score column indicates score after each Rehmer goal.

Honours 
Hertha BSC
 DFB-Ligapokal: 2001, 2002; runner-up 2000

Eintracht Frankfurt
 DFB-Pokal: runner-up 2005–06

Germany
 FIFA World Cup: runner-up 2002

References

External links 
 
 
 

1972 births
Living people
Footballers from Berlin
East German footballers
German footballers
Association football defenders
Bundesliga players
1. FC Union Berlin players
FC Hansa Rostock players
Hertha BSC players
Eintracht Frankfurt players
Germany international footballers
UEFA Euro 2000 players
2002 FIFA World Cup players